Spoon and chopstick rest is a piece of tableware for resting a spoon and chopsticks without touching the table. In Korean cuisine context, it can be referred to as sujeo rest as sujeo is a paired set of spoon and chopsticks, which is very common in Korea.

Gallery

See also 
 Chopstick rest
 Knife rest
 Spoon rest

References 

Chinese cuisine
Chinese food preparation utensils
Chinese inventions
Food preparation utensils
Eating utensils
Japanese cuisine
Korean cuisine
Korean food preparation utensils
Serving utensils
Taiwanese cuisine